The following list includes all arenas in use by a Suncorp Super Netball team as of the 2020 Suncorp Super Netball season. Information included in this list are arena locations, seating capacities, years opened and time in use.

Current arenas

* Alternate venue used by the team listed.

See also

List of A-League stadiums
List of Australian Football League grounds
List of Australian cricket grounds
List of ice rinks in Australia
List of indoor arenas in Australia
 List of National Basketball League (Australia) venues
List of National Rugby League stadiums
List of Australian rugby league stadiums
List of Australian rugby union stadiums
List of soccer stadiums in Australia
List of Oceanian stadiums by capacity
Netball in Australia
Netball Australia

References

venues
Netball
Suncorp Super Netball venues